This article lists paintings by Frans Post (1612–1680), a Dutch Golden Age artist who was the first European to paint landscapes of the Americas. Frans Post disembarked in Brazil in 1637, following the retinue of John Maurice, Prince of Nassau-Siegen, who had recently been appointed as the governor of the Dutch possessions in Northeast Brazil by the Dutch West India Company. Along with Albert Eckhout and Zacharias Wagener, Post was in charge of documenting the new Dutch colonies in South America, but while his companions were devoted to depicting the Brazilian flora, fauna, and people, he focused exclusively on the landscapes of the so-called "New Holland".

Frans Post returned to Europe in 1644, after producing a limited number of in loco artworks, of which only seven have survived. Nevertheless, the exoticism of his landscapes, rich in tropical details yet unknown to the European public, soon attracted the attention of new clients. As a result, Post would devote the rest of his artistic career to the production of paintings with Brazilian themes, based on the sketches and drawings of what he had observed onsite. Post's known output numbers about 160 paintings, practically all of them of Brazilian landscapes. He did not date his paintings, making it difficult to establish a precise timeline of his production. A large part of his oeuvre is currently housed in Brazilian museums and collections (Ricardo Brennand Institute in Recife, National Museum of Fine Arts in Rio de Janeiro, São Paulo Museum of Art, etc.), but several examples of his works may be found around the world, mainly in Europe (Louvre, Rijksmuseum) and the United States. In the following list, artworks are presented in loose chronological order.

Paintings

See also

 Brazilian painting
 Dutch Brazil
 Dutch Golden Age painting

References

Further reading
 Lago, Pedro Corrêa, and Lago, Bia Corrêa. Frans Post: (1612–1680): obra completa, Rio de Janeiro: Editora Capivara, 1996.
 Lago, Bia Corrêa. Frans Post e o Brasil holandês na coleção do Instituto Ricardo Brennand, Recife: IRB, 2003.

External links
 Biographical note at Enciclopédia Itaú Cultural

Post, Frans